Porcelain stone might refer to:

 Petuntse, a material for Chinese porcelain
 China stone, a material for English porcelain